Theel is a river of Saarland, Germany. It is 25.4km long and flows into the Prims near Lebach.

See also
List of rivers of Saarland

References

Rivers of Saarland
Rivers of Germany